Léopold Chandezon (died 17 July 1846) was a French playwright and librettist of the 19th century whose plays have been presented on the most famous Parisian stages of his time: Théâtre de l'Ambigu-Comique, Théâtre de la Gaîté, Théâtre de la Porte-Saint-Martin etc.

Works 

 Le Dernier bulletin, ou la Paix, impromptu with vaudevilles, with Darrodes de Lillebonne, 1806
 Baudoin de Jérusalem ou les Héritiers de Palestine, melodrama in three acts, with Eugène Cantiran de Boirie, 1814
 Henri IV, ou la Prise de Paris, historical melodrama in 3 acts, with de Boirie and J-B. Dubois, 1814
 Jean sans peur, duc de Bourgogne, ou le Pont de Montereau, heroic melodrama in 3 acts in prose, with de Boirie, 1815
 Le Mariage de Clovis ou Le Berceau de la Monarchie française, melodrama in 3 acts, à grand spectacle, with de Boirie and J-B. Dubois, 1815
 La Marquise de Gange, ou les Trois frères, historic melodrama in 3 acts in prose, with de Boirie, 1815
 La Sibylle, ou La mort et le médecin, féerie in 2 acts, with songs and dances, with de Boirie and J-B. Dubois, 1815
 Le Connétable Du Guesclin, ou le Château des Pyrénées, melodrama in 3 acts, in prose, with de Boirie, 1816
 Le sacrifice d'Abraham, play in 4 acts, with Cuvelier, 1816
 Les Machabées ou La prise de Jérusalem, sacred drama in 4 acts, with Cuvelier, 1817
 La Fille maudite, melodrama in 3 acts, with de Boirie, 1817
 La Gueule de lion, ou la Mère esclave, melodrama in 3 acts in prose, with Cuvelier, 1817
 Roland furieux, chivalrous pantomime and magic in 4 acts, with prologues, with Cuvelier, 1817
 La Forêt de Sénart, melodrama in 3 acts, with de Boirie, 1818
 Jean Sbogar, melodrama in 3 acts, with Cuvelier, 1818
 Le Coffre de fer, ou la Grotte des Apennins, pantomime in three acts, with Cuvelier, 1818
 La Grand-maman, 1 act comedy, in prose, mixed with vaudevilles, with Jean-Baptiste Dubois, 1819
 La Montre d'or, ou le Retour du fils, mimodrame in 2 acts, with Cuvelier, 1820
 La Muette, ou la Servante de Weilhem, fait historique in 1 act, 1820
 Le Paysan grand seigneur, ou la Pauvre mère, melodrama in 3 acts, with de Boirie, 1820
 Sydonie, ou La famille de Meindorff, with Cuvelier, 1821
 L'armure, ou le Soldat moldave, melodrama in 3 acts, with Cuvelier, 1821
 La Prise de corps, ou la Fortune inattendue, folie anecdotique in 1 acte and in prose, 1821
 La Prise de Milan, ou Dorothée et La Trémouille, play in 3 acts, with Cuvelier, 1821
 Le Temple de la mort, ou Ogier-le-Danois, play in 3 acts, with Cuvelier, 1821
 La chasse ou le jardinier de Muldorff, comédie en vaudevilles, in one acte, with de Boirie, 1823
 Le Remords, melodrama in 3 acts, 1823
 Cardillac ou Le quartier de l'Arsenal, with Béraud, 1824
 Les Aventuriers, ou le Naufrage, melodrama in 3 acts, with Antony Béraud, 1825
 La Corbeille de mariage, ou les Étrennes du futur, vaudeville in 1 act, with Maurice Alhoy and Armand-François Jouslin de La Salle, 1825
 Cagliostro, melodrama in 3 acts, with Béraud, 1825
 Les Prisonniers de guerre, melodrama in 3 acts, with Béraud, 1825
 La Redingotte et la perruque, ou le Testament, mimodrame in 3 actes, with Béraud, 1825
 Mazeppa, ou le Cheval tartare, mimodrame in 3 acts, after lord Byron, with Jean-Guillaume-Antoine Cuvelier, 1825
 Le Corregidor ou les Contrebandiers, melodrama in 3 acts, with Béraud, 1826
 Le Rôdeur, ou les Deux apprentis, drama in 3 acts, with Béraud, 1827
 Le Vétéran, military play in 2 acts, with Béraud, 1827
 Desrues, melodrama in 3 acts, with Jules Dulong and Saint-Amand, 1828
 Irène, ou la Prise de Napoli, melodrama in 2 acts, with Béraud, 1828
 La Muse du boulevard, dream in two periods, with prologue and epilogue, mixed with songs, with Dulong and Saint-Amand, 1828
 L’Éléphant du roi de Siam, play in 3 acts and 9 parts, with Ferdinand Laloue, 1829
 Le Nain de Sunderwald, play in 2 acts and 8 parts, 1829
 La Tour d'Auvergne, premier grenadier de France, military play in 2 periods and 8 parts, 1829
 Le Voile bleu, folie-vaudeville in 1 act, with Michel-Nicolas Balisson de Rougemont and Dulong, 1827
 Ma Rente avant tout, comédie en vaudevilles in 1 act, 1837

19th-century French dramatists and playwrights
French librettists